Eastward, also known as the ALLCORN House, is located in Montclair, Essex County, New Jersey, United States. The house was built in 1902 and was added to the National Register of Historic Places on July 1, 1988.

It was designed by architect A.F. Norris.  The house was featured in Scientific American building edition.

See also
National Register of Historic Places listings in Essex County, New Jersey

References

Houses on the National Register of Historic Places in New Jersey
Houses completed in 1902
Houses in Essex County, New Jersey
Montclair, New Jersey
National Register of Historic Places in Essex County, New Jersey
New Jersey Register of Historic Places